Eve's pudding, also known as Mother Eve's pudding, is a type of traditional British pudding made from apples baked under a Victoria sponge cake mixture. The name is a reference to the apple variety traditionally used (an eating apple) called Eve. The pudding can be served with custard, cream, or ice cream. It is a version of Duke of Cumberland's pudding, named after Prince William, Duke of Cumberland. The first known recipe is from 1824 and uses grated bread and grated suet.

References

British puddings
Apple dishes
British cakes